Venustiano Carranza International Airport, also known as Monclova International Airport, is an international airport located at Frontera, Coahuila, Mexico. It handles national and international air traffic for the metropolitan area of Monclova and Frontera.

It handled 2,175 passengers in 2018, and 19 in 2019.

The airport is named after Mexican President Venustiano Carranza.

See also

 List of the busiest airports in Mexico

References

External links
 MMMV at Fallingrain.
 MMMV at Elite Jets.
 MMMV photo at Our Airports.

Airports in Coahuila